"Manhattan Beach" is an American march by John Philip Sousa (1854–1932). It was written in 1893 to commemorate the Manhattan Beach Park resort. It follows this march style: Intro(4 bars)--[:A(16):]--[:B(16):]--Trio [:C(16):]--[:D(16):]. In part D, the tune starts quietly, grows louder and fades away. The march is notable for lacking a "stinger" or tutti chord on beat two.

See also 
 List of marches by John Philip Sousa

References

Sousa marches
1893 compositions
Concert band pieces
Manhattan Beach, Brooklyn